The 1993 FIM motorcycle Grand Prix was the last round of the 1993 Grand Prix motorcycle racing season. It took place on 26 September 1993 at the Jarama circuit and was held to replace the South African Grand Prix.

500 cc race report
Mick Doohan is out with a broken collarbone.

Kevin Schwantz takes the start, but John Kocinski is soon through, then it’s Shinichi Itoh, Luca Cadalora, Alex Barros, and Daryl Beattie.

Cadalora crashes out, as does Itoh and Kocinski. Kocinski smacks a medic who is trying to help get the Cagiva going again.

500 cc classification

250 cc classification

References

Spanish motorcycle Grand Prix
FIM
FIM motorcycle Grand Prix